Clerici solution is an aqueous solution of equal parts of thallium formate (Tl(HCO2)) and thallium malonate (Tl(C3H3O4)). It is free-flowing and odorless. Its color fades from yellowish to colorless when diluted. The solution was invented in 1907 by the Italian chemist Enrico Clerici (1862–1938). Its value in mineralogy and gemology was reported in 1930s. It allows the separation of minerals by density with a traditional flotation method. Its advantages include transparency and an easily controllable density in the range 1–5 g/cm3 as a result of changes in solubility (and therefore density of the saturated solution) with temperature.

Saturated Clerici solution is more dense than spinel, garnet, diamond, and corundum, as well as many other minerals. A saturated Clerici solution at  can separate densities up to 4.2 g/cm3, while a saturated solution at  can separate densities up to 5.0 g/cm3. The change in density is due to the increased solubility of the heavy thallium salts at the higher temperature. A range of solution densities between 1.0 and 5.0 g/cm3 can be achieved by diluting with water. The refractive index shows significant, linear and well reproducible variation with the density; it changes from 1.44 for 2 g/cm3 to 1.70 for 4.28 g/cm3. Thus the density can be easily measured by optical techniques.

The color of the Clerici solution changes significantly upon minor dilution. In particular, at room temperature the concentrated solution with the density of 4.25 g/cm3 is amber-yellow. However, a minor dilution with water to the density of 4.0 g/cm3 makes it as colorless as glass or water (absorption threshold 350 nm).

Procedure for determining mineral density using the Clerici solution are available.

Two substantial drawbacks of the Clerici solution are its high toxicity and corrosiveness. Today sodium polytungstate has been introduced as a replacement, but its solutions do not reach as high in density as the Clerici solution.

References

Thallium(I) compounds